Liceo Comercial Diego Portales is a Chilean high school located in Rancagua, Chile.

References 

Educational institutions established in 1942
Secondary schools in Chile
Schools in Cachapoal Province
1942 establishments in England